Juma Khan, an  ethnic Baluch from Afghanistan's Nimroz Province, is a drug lord with links to the Taliban.

Juma Khan was an illiterate provincial drug smuggler from southwestern Afghanistan in the 1990s. He suddenly rose to national prominence after the American-led invasion of Afghanistan. He was briefly detained by American forces after the 2001 fall of the Taliban and released, even though American officials knew that he was involved in narcotics trafficking. After being released, he inexplicably seized control of the town of Bahramcha in the Chagai Hills on the Pakistan-Iran-Afghanistan border in late 2001 and turned it into a hub of drug smuggling and gun running into Pakistan and Iran. Later Juma Khan allegedly went on to run the Taliban's opium and heroin distribution network, selling worldwide and using the profits to equip Taliban forces militarily.

His organization was designated as a Narcotics Kingpin under the SDN by the United States Department of the Treasury's Office of Foreign Assets Control, with addresses in Pakistan and Afghanistan.

In 2008, he was detained for unknown reasons in Indonesia and transported to New York. He was quietly released on April 20, 2018 without any pending charges or a trial.
No official explanation was provided. The details surrounding his release have been very secretive and were not announced in the mainstream media.

See also
Bashir Noorzai

References

External links 
"Fierce factional fighting reported in northwestern Afghanistan" Deutsche Presse-Agentur March 26, 2003. Lexis-Nexis September 10, 2003
"Afghan government probes killings in northwest" Agence France Presse May 1, 2003. Lexis Nexis September 10, 2003
"Ex-Taliban governor held in Afghanistan" April 6, 2003. The News September 10, 2003

Baloch people
Taliban members
Living people
Afghan drug traffickers
Year of birth missing (living people)
Deobandis
Specially Designated Nationals and Blocked Persons List
People sanctioned under the Foreign Narcotics Kingpin Designation Act